Margaret Lee Workman (born May 22, 1947) is an American lawyer and a former justice of the Supreme Court of Appeals of West Virginia. Her 1988 election to the Supreme Court made her the first woman elected to statewide office in West Virginia and first female Justice on the Court.

Life
Workman was born in Charleston, West Virginia to  Mary Emma Thomas Workman and Frank Eugene Workman. Her father was a coal miner, and his ancestors were some of the first settlers of Boone County, West Virginia. She attended public schools in  Kanawha County, West Virginia. She attended Morris Harvey College (now the University of Charleston) for one year and received her undergraduate degree from West Virginia University. She received a degree in law from West Virginia University College of Law. She was the first person in her family to attend college. She has three children.

Career
As a senior in high school, Workman wrote a letter to West Virginia Governor Hulett Smith seeking employment, and she was hired to handle correspondence at the governor's office. This job led her to enroll in law school. After graduating from West Virginia University College of Law, she worked in Washington, D.C., for U.S. Senator Jennings Randolph, where she drafted legislation and did legal research.  In 1974, she served as assistant majority counsel to the United States Senate Public Works Committee. She later returned to West Virginia to work with Professor (later Justice) Franklin D. Cleckley in his private practice of law. She became a law clerk for the 13th Judicial Circuit (Kanawha County) in West Virginia. In 1976, she served as an advance woman for Rosalynn Carter in the Jimmy Carter Presidential Campaign. Workman then opened her own law practice in  Charleston, West Virginia. In 1981, she was appointed a circuit judge by Governor Jay Rockefeller in Kanawha County, West Virginia, to fill a vacancy. She was subsequently elected in 1982. She inherited the largest backlog of cases in West Virginia, and during her tenure, reduced said backlog to the lowest in the circuit. She also held more jury trials than any other circuit judge during her tenure. She was elected to the Supreme Court in 1988 for a 12-year term, expiring in 2000, making her the first woman elected to this position and the first woman elected to statewide office in West Virginia.  She, however, resigned in 1999 with 18 months left on her term. She returned to her private law practice.

She then entered the Democratic primary in 2002 and 2004 for West Virginia's 2nd congressional district seat, but lost both times.  She then ran again for the court in 2008 and was elected. Workman previously served as chief justice in 1993, 1997, 2011, and 2015.

Impeachment
Following a series of controversies involving excessive spending, the West Virginia House Judiciary Committee voted to recommend that Workman and the three remaining justices be impeached on August 7, 2018 "for maladministration, corruption, incompetency, neglect of duty, and certain high crimes and misdemeanors". Based on the committee recommendation, Workman was impeached by the full West Virginia House of Delegates on August 13, 2018.

Justice Workman's impeachment trial was scheduled to begin on October 15, 2018. However, on October 11, the Supreme Court of Appeals, temporarily reconstituted with five circuit court judges, issued an injunction blocking the impeachment trial, stating that the articles of impeachment presented by the House of Delegates against Workman violated the separation of powers doctrine and, therefore, the Senate has no jurisdiction to try Workman on the impeachment. In addition, Judge Paul Farrell, who is presiding over the trial as acting Chief Justice, stated that he would not preside over Justice Workman's trial while the injunction was in place. The Senate met on October 15 and adjourned with no final decision on how to proceed being made. Senate President Mitch Carmichael did announce after the session had adjourned that the Senate would ask the Supreme Court of Appeals to reconsider their decision. Workman retired when her term expired on December 31, 2020.

Awards and honors
In 1993, Workman received the West Virginia Prosecuting Attorneys Association's Excellence in Criminal Justice Award. She has also received the Susan B. Anthony Award,  the Celebrate Women Award for Government and Public Service Award, and the WVU College of Law Women's Law Caucus Distinguished Women in the Law Award.

Elections

Fall 2008: In the November General Election, Workman and Ketchum faced Republican nominee Beth Walker. Walker was the sole Republican nominee running for one of two spots on the Court, guaranteeing the election of either Ketchum or Workman and that the Court would likely remain majority-Democratic for at least four more years. Although Republicans won at the presidential level in West Virginia for the third straight presidential election, Democrats swept all of the other statewide offices on the ballot, including Governor, U.S. Senator, and every other executive office holder. However, the relatively nonpartisan nature of judicial races and the victory of Brent Benjamin to the Supreme Court in 2004 as a Republican, made the November general election competitive. Nevertheless, Huntington trial attorney Ketchum and former Justice Workman beat out Beth Walker for seats on the Court. Walker would later win election in the Court's first nonpartisan election in 2016.

Spring 2008: Justice Larry Starcher declined to run for re-election, opening a seat on the Court. Additionally, then-Chief Justice Spike Maynard was up for re-election in 2008 after having been elected to a twelve-year term in 1996. During his re-election campaign, Maynard drew criticism when photos became public of him vacationing on the French Riviera in 2006 with Massey Energy CEO Don Blankenship before voting with the majority in a 3-2 decision reversing a $76 million judgment against Massey Energy. At the time, Maynard said their friendship “has never influenced any decision I’ve made for the Court. Like most judges I don't reward my friends, or punish my enemies from the bench.” Despite outraising his competitors, fallout from the incident aided former Justice Workman and Huntington attorney Menis Ketchum to win the Democratic nominations for two seats in the November general election.

2004: Workman challenged incumbent Republican Senate Minority Leader, Vic Sprouse. Workman was unopposed in the primary and became the Democratic nominee. Workman lost to Sprouse 56.4%-43.6%.  

2002: Workman ran for the Democratic nomination to West Virginia's 2nd congressional district, a seat won by Republican Shelley Moore Capito in 2000. Prior to Capito's election in 2000, the District had remained in Democratic control for 64 of the prior 68 years. Workman faced former state senator and 2000 Democratic nominee for the seat, Jim Humphreys, in the May nominating contest. Humphreys beat Workman by a razor thin 51-49% margin to face a re-match against Capito. Capito went on to beat Humphreys 60-40% in the November general election, improving on her 48.5%-46% victory in 2000. Capito would go onto successfully hold the seat until her election to the U.S. Senate in 2014.

Fall 1988: Workman and Miller faced Republican nominees former House Delegate and West Virginia Public Service Commissioner Charlotte Lane and attorney Jeniver Jones in the November general election. Despite Republicans winning their third straight U.S. presidential election at the federal level, Lane and Jones faced an uphill battle to beat Workman and Miller in the then-solidly Democratic state. Since 1930, no Republican had been elected as a Supreme Court Justice. Workman and Miller easily went onto beat Lane and Jones in the general election. Workman's election made her the first female Justice on the Supreme Court and first woman elected to statewide office in West Virginia. 

Spring 1988: Then-circuit court judge Margaret Workman decided to run for one of two seats up on the Supreme Court. Workman joined fellow attorneys Fred Fox and John Hey as challengers to incumbent Justices Darrell McGraw and Thomas Miller. Fox, Hey, and Workman ran against McGraw and Miller and labeled them as "judicial activists" during their time on the bench, accusing them of aiding special interest groups, such as labor unions, personal injury claimants, workers' compensation claimants, and criminal defendants. The attacks were not entirely successful, as Miller led the five-way Democratic primary to advance to the November general election. However, Workman did edge out incumbent McGraw to become the Democratic nominee for the second seat. McGraw later returned to elected office as West Virginia Attorney General in 1996, a position he held until his defeat in 2012.

See also
List of female state supreme court justices

References

External links
Biography - Supreme Court of Appeals website

|-

|-

|-

|-

|-

|-

1947 births
Living people
21st-century American judges
United States judges impeached by state or territorial governments
Lawyers from Charleston, West Virginia
Politicians from Charleston, West Virginia
Justices of the Supreme Court of Appeals of West Virginia
West Virginia circuit court judges
West Virginia Democrats
West Virginia lawyers
West Virginia University College of Law alumni
Women chief justices of state supreme courts in the United States
Women in West Virginia politics
Chief Justices of the Supreme Court of Appeals of West Virginia
21st-century American women judges
20th-century American women judges
20th-century American judges